Sena Sakaguchi (born 9 July 1999) is a Japanese racing driver who currently competes in the Super Formula Championship and Super GT.

Career

Sakaguchi began his senior competition career in 2015, competing for Sutekina Racing Team in the final four rounds of the F4 Japanese Championship. Through eight races that season, he registered a podium at Motegi and finished outside of the points just once, taking 10th in the championship. The following season, he graduated to the Japanese F3 Championship, taking part thanks to the Honda Formula Dream Project. Sakaguchi continued competing in F4 during 2016, tallying his first win in the series at Motegi en route to a second-place point finish. In his maiden F3 season, Sakaguchi would finish 9th in points.

He returned to F3 in 2017 with Honda support, finishing an improved 6th in points, netting his first podium in the series at the penultimate race at Sugo. In 2018, Sakaguchi joined Toda Racing and built upon his previous results, finishing fourth in points off the back of five podium finishes in 17 races. 2018 also marked what would have been his debut in the Super Formula Championship with Team Mugen, filling in for Nirei Fukuzumi, who was competing in the F2 Championship that weekend. However, the race was canceled due to inclement weather. Following the 2018 season, Sakaguchi was released from his junior driver role at Honda.

2019 marked Sakaguchi's first experience with sports car racing, as he joined K-Tunes Racing for the 2019 Super GT Series season, competing alongside Morio Nitta in the GT300 class. The drive came about thanks to Sakaguchi's uncle, Ryohei, who had connections with the K-Tunes team. Sakaguchi and Nitta would take two class victories that season; the rain-shortened season-opener at Okayama and Round 3 at Suzuka, finishing 2nd in points. The 2019 season also saw Sakaguchi take on a reduced presence in F3 as a result, tallying three podiums in five races driving for TOM'S. 

Following the Japanese F3 split at the end of 2019, Sakaguchi competed in both of the resulting series during 2020. In the Super Formula Lights series, Sakaguchi ran the full season with B-Max Racing. Despite finishing just one race outside of the podium positions, he would finish second in the standings, nearly 40 points behind Ritomo Miyata. In the K2 Planet-promoted Formula Regional Japanese Championship, however, Sakaguchi won all eleven races that he competed in, taking the championship by just over 50 points despite missing the triple-header at Sugo. During 2020, Sakaguchi also played the role of substitute on two occasions, initially replacing Heikki Kovalainen in TGR Team SARD's GT500 class entry at Fuji in July. Later, in September, he filled in for Kondō Racing's Kenta Yamashita during the Super Formula Championship round at Okayama. However, Sakaguchi once again was unable to make it to the grid, crashing on the warm-up lap and failing to officially register his Super Formula debut.

For 2021, Sakaguchi secured a full-time ride in the series with P.mu/cerumo・INGING. In his rookie season, Sakaguchi claimed two podium finishes en route to a 7th-place points finish, taking second at the rain-shortened round at Autopolis and the second event at Motegi. Visa issues for Frenchman Sacha Fenestraz forced Sakaguchi to add a part-time campaign in the GT500 class of the Super GT series. He would pair with Ryo Hirakawa for the first five rounds of the season, taking pole at the opening round alongside two podium finishes, before finishing the season with K-Tunes Racing in the GT300 class.

Ahead of 2022, Sakaguchi moved to the GT500 class full-time, pairing with Yuji Kunimoto in the #19 TGR Team WedsSport Bandoh entry. Despite Sakaguchi himself claiming three individual poles and the entry scoring four total, the team would only finish 11th in the championship, finishing no higher than fifth in any given race. At the conclusion of the season, sports car racing publication Sportscar365 named Sakaguchi as an honorable mention for their GT500 Driver of the Year. Sakaguchi would return to the team in 2023, paired once again with Kunimoto.

Racing record

Career summary

* Season still in progress.

‡ Team standings.

Complete Formula Regional Japanese Championship results 
(key) (Races in bold indicate pole position) (Races in italics indicate fastest lap)

Complete Super Formula results
(key) (Races in bold indicate pole position) (Races in italics indicate fastest lap)

* Season still in progress.

Complete Super GT results

* Season still in progress.

References

External links
Sena Sakaguchi at Motorsport.com

1999 births
Living people
Japanese racing drivers
Japanese Formula 3 Championship drivers
Super Formula drivers
Super GT drivers
Formula Regional Japanese Championship drivers
Sportspeople from Osaka
Mugen Motorsports drivers
TOM'S drivers
Kondō Racing drivers
Toyota Gazoo Racing drivers
Japanese F4 Championship drivers
B-Max Racing drivers